The Grand Ole Carousel was a carousel at Six Flags St. Louis. It opened in 1972, and was originally manufactured by Philadelphia Toboggan Coasters in 1915. The Carousel was originally installed at Luna Park in Cleveland, Ohio.

References

External links
Official website

Six Flags St. Louis
Philadelphia Toboggan Coasters carousels
Carousels in the United States
Six Flags attractions